The Troy Laundry Building is a 1927 building in the South Lake Union/Cascade District of Seattle. The building was originally built to house the Troy Laundry Company. It was designated as Seattle Landmark in March 1996.

Renovation
The building was demolished in 2013, but its facade facing the intersection of Fairview Avenue and Thomas Street was preserved for incorporation into two new highrise office buildings, known as the Troy Block. The project cost an estimated $285 million and began construction in 2015. This two tower complex is designed by architecture firm Perkins + Will with Lease Crutcher Lewis as the general contractor. One tower is 13 stories high while the other is 12 stories. The entire complex was sold to a Miami-based real estate investment firm in 2019 for $740 million.

Seattle Coffee Works operates here, as of 2023.

See also
List of Seattle landmarks

References

External links

Landmarks Preservation Board Report on Designation

Landmarks in Seattle
South Lake Union, Seattle